Little Rockford was an Antarctic exploration base from December 1958 to January 1965, located on the Ross Ice Shelf, south of the Bay of Whales. Little Rockford was a field camp and weather station along the Little America tractor trail and was located between McMurdo Sound and Byrd Station, 160 miles from Little America. It was named after Rockford, Illinois, the hometown of Admiral George Dufek. Admiral Dufek was in charge of the United States military mission, through the United States Navy, to support research in Antarctica named Operation Deep Freeze, and the first man to land at the South Pole by airplane.

Originally, Little Rockford was established near the western edge of the Ross Ice Shelf close to the King Edward VII Peninsula in December 1958. The following year it was relocated to the east edge of Marie Byrd Land. Little Rockford's use was discontinued in January 1965.

See also

List of Antarctic research stations
Little America

References

Outposts of Antarctica
United States Antarctic Program
Outposts of the Ross Dependency
1958 establishments in Antarctica
1965 disestablishments in Antarctica
King Edward VII Land
Outposts of Marie Byrd Land